Frederik Alexander Adolf Gregory (13 May 1814 in Doesburg – 16 July 1891 in The Hague) was a Dutch vice admiral. He was married to Catherine de Sauvage Nolting.

References

1814 births
1891 deaths
People from Doesburg
Royal Netherlands Navy admirals
Royal Netherlands Navy personnel
Commanders of the Order of the Netherlands Lion